Jarkko Nieminen defeated Mario Ančić 6–2, 6–2 to win the 2006 Heineken Open singles competition. Fernando González was the defending singles champion of the tennis tournament, held in Auckland, New Zealand.

Seeds
A champion seed is indicated in bold text while text in italics indicates the round in which that seed was eliminated.

  Fernando González (quarterfinals)
  David Ferrer (quarterfinals)
  Robby Ginepri (first round)
  Dominik Hrbatý (first round)
  Mario Ančić (final)
  Olivier Rochus (semifinals)
  Jarkko Nieminen (champion)
  Feliciano López (first round)

Draw

References

External links
 Singles draw
 Qualifying Singles draw

Singles